Ella Louise Donnison (born 27 February 1975) is an English former cricketer who played as a wicket-keeper and right-handed batter. She appeared in three One Day Internationals for England at the 1999 Women's European Cricket Championship at Nykøbing Mors Cricket Club Ground, Denmark in July 1999. She scored 34 runs and took three catches and two stumpings as England won the tournament. She was also captain for all three matches. She also represented England at under-20, under-21 and under-23 levels. She played domestic cricket for East Midlands and Nottinghamshire.

References

External links
 
 

1975 births
Living people
Cricketers from Nottingham
England women One Day International cricketers
Nottinghamshire women cricketers
Wicket-keepers